Detarium is a plant genus of the family Fabaceae.  It contains 3 species of tree in west African forests.

The genus produces timber that may serve as a mahogany substitute. The fruit is edible.

References
 Mabberley, D. J.  (1987). The Plant Book: A Portable Dictionary of the Higher Plants. Cambridge: Cambridge University Press. .

Detarioideae
Trees of Africa
Fabaceae genera